The Abbey of Saint Maurice, Agaunum ( or Saint-Maurice-en-Valais) is a Swiss monastery of canons regular in Saint-Maurice, Canton of Valais, which dates from the 6th century. It is situated against a cliff in a section of the road between Geneva and the Simplon Pass (to northern Italy). The abbey itself is a territorial abbacy and not part of any diocese. It is best known for its connection to the martyrdom of the Theban Legion, its original practice of perpetual psalmody, and a collection of art and antiquity.

The abbey is a Swiss heritage site of national significance.

History
The abbey of St. Maurice is built on the ruins of a Roman shrine of the 1st century B.C. dedicated to the god Mercury in the Roman staging-post of Agaunum. According to  Eucherius, Bishop of Lyon, around 370, Theodorus, Bishop of Valais, constructed a small shrine to commemorate the martyrdom of St. Maurice and the Theban Legion, which was said to have occurred in the area where the abbey is located. Theodorus then gathered the local hermits in a common life, thus beginning the Community of Saint-Maurice.

In 515, the Basilica of St. Maurice of Agaunum became the church of a monastery under the patronage of King Sigismund of Burgundy, the first ruler in his dynasty to convert from Arian Christianity to Trinitarian Christianity.

The abbey became known for a form of perpetual psalmody known as laus perennis that was practised there beginning in 522 or 523. The chants were sung day and night, by several choirs in rotation without ceasing. The practice continued there until the 9th century, when the monks were replaced by a community of canons. Amatus of Grenoble joined the abbey around 581, later retiring to a hermitage.

The abbey had some of the richest and best preserved treasures in Western Europe, such as the Ewer of Saint-Maurice d'Agaune.

In the mid-9th century, Hucbert, brother-in-law of the Emperor Lothair II, seized the abbey. In 864 he was killed in a battle at the Orbe River and was replaced by the victor, Count Conrad of Auxerre, who later became the commendatory abbot of the abbey.

Boso, later King of Provence, (850-887) received the abbey around 870 from his brother-in-law, Charles the Bald. Conrad's son, Rudolph I of Burgundy, who had inherited the commendatory abbacy from him, succeeded Boson as king and was crowned in 888 in a ceremony at the abbey itself, which he then made the royal residence. The offspring of Conrad of Auxerre became the Kings of Burgundy, in a line running from Rudolf I to Rudolf III. They directed the abbey until around the year 1000. The monastery remained the property of the Kingdom of Burgundy until 1033, when, through the defeat in battle of Eudes, a nephew of Rudolf III, it passed to the control of the House of Savoy. Amadeus III, Count of Savoy, became the commendatory abbot of the monastery in 1103 and worked to revive religious observance at the abbey by installing there, in 1128, the community of canons regular, who still live there under the Rule of St. Augustine, in place of the secular canons.

Throughout the history of the abbey, its strategic mountain pass location and independent patronage has subjected it to the whims of war. The abbey was often forced to pay ransom or house troops. In 1840, Pope Gregory XVI conferred the title of the See of Bethlehem in perpetuity on the abbey.

Today the abbey consists of some 40 canons, with 2 lay brothers. The Most Rev. Abbot Joseph Roduit, C.R.A., who was elected in 1999, resigned with the permission of Pope Francis on Wednesday, 18 March 2015, replaced by Abbot Jean Scarcella on 1 August 2015 . The canonical community serves both the spiritual needs of the territory of the abbey nullius as well as five parishes in the Diocese of Sion. The canons also operate a highly ranked secondary school.

Architecture

The abbey has been built and rebuilt over a period of at least 15 centuries. Excavations on the site have revealed a baptistry dating to the 4th and 5th centuries, a series of four main Carolingian era churches built over one another dating from the 5th to the 11th century, and crypts built between the 4th and 8th century.

The current church was first built in the 17th century while the tower dates to the 11th century. Preceding Clermont-Ferrand Cathedral in 946, Chartres Cathedral ca. 1020 and Rouen Cathedral ca. 1030, the abbey was an early example of an ambulatory plan with radiating chapels.
The Romanesque tower was reconstructed in 1945 to repair damage caused by a massive falling rock. The newly installed carillon is the largest built to date in Switzerland.

School
The Lycée-collège de l'Abbaye de Saint-Maurice is a maturité gymnasiale, a gymnasium which offers the matura as the school-leaving qualification. The canons have educated students at the abbey since its foundation but the school in its modern form was opened in 1806. Notable alumni include controversial former FIFA president Sepp Blatter, former Presidents of Switzerland Alphons Egli and Pascal Couchepin and former chairman of the Swiss National Bank Jean-Pierre Roth.

See also
List of Carolingian monasteries
Carolingian architecture
Graines Castle

References

External links

 The Abbey of Saint-Maurice d'Agaune  

Christian monasteries established in the 6th century
Augustinian monasteries in Switzerland
Romanesque architecture in Switzerland
Buildings and structures in Valais
Cultural property of national significance in Valais
Tourist attractions in Valais
Roman Catholic churches in Switzerland
Basilica churches in Switzerland